Gomotartsi Knoll (‘Gomotarska Mogila’ \go-mo-'tar-ska mo-'gi-la\) is the rocky, mostly ice-covered peak of elevation 942 m in the south part of Widmark Ice Piedmont on Stresher Peninsula, Loubet Coast in Graham Land, Antarctica.  It is named after the settlement of Gomotartsi in Northwestern Bulgaria.

Location
British mapping in 1976.

Maps
 Antarctic Digital Database (ADD). Scale 1:250000 topographic map of Antarctica. Scientific Committee on Antarctic Research (SCAR). Since 1993, regularly upgraded and updated.
British Antarctic Territory. Scale 1:200000 topographic map. DOS 610 Series, Sheet W 66 64. Directorate of Overseas Surveys, Tolworth, UK, 1976.

Notes

References
 Bulgarian Antarctic Gazetteer. Antarctic Place-names Commission. (details in Bulgarian, basic data in English)
Gomotartsi Knoll. SCAR Composite Antarctic Gazetteer.

External links
 Gomotartsi Knoll. Copernix satellite image

Mountains of Graham Land
Bulgaria and the Antarctic
Loubet Coast